The Journal of Shi'a Islamic Studies is a quarterly peer-reviewed academic journal covering research on Shia Islam, including theology, philosophy, mysticism, law, jurisprudence, politics, history, Qur'an and Hadith studies, and current issues relevant to Shi'ism. It is published by ICAS Press on behalf of The Islamic College and was established in 2008. The journal also contains a book reviews section to review new and old works pertaining to Shi'a Islam.

Abstracting and indexing
The journal is abstracted and indexed in:

References

External links

Islamic studies journals
Shia literature
Publications established in 2008
Quarterly journals
English-language journals

https://muse.jhu.edu/journal/582